Leiomyosarcoma  is a malignant (cancerous) smooth muscle tumor. A benign tumor originating from the same tissue is termed leiomyoma. While  leiomyosarcomas are not thought to arise from leiomyomas, some leiomyoma variants' classification is evolving. 

About one in 100,000 people are diagnosed with leiomyosarcoma (LMS) each year. LMS is one of the more common types of soft-tissue sarcoma, representing 10 to 20% of new cases. (Leiomyosarcoma of the bone is more rare.) Sarcoma is rare, consisting of only 1% of cancer cases in adults. Leiomyosarcomas can be very unpredictable; they can remain dormant for long periods of time and recur after years. It is a resistant cancer, meaning generally not very responsive to chemotherapy or radiation. The best outcomes occur when it can be removed surgically with wide margins early, while small and still in situ.

Mechanism
Smooth muscle cells make up the involuntary muscles, which are found in most parts of the body, including the uterus, stomach and intestines, the walls of all blood vessels, and the skin, so leiomyosarcomas can appear at any site in the body. They are most commonly found in the uterus, stomach, small intestine and retroperitoneum.

Uterine leiomyosarcomas come from the smooth muscle in the muscle layer of the uterus. Cutaneous leiomyosarcomas derive from the pilo-erector muscles in the skin. Gastrointestinal leiomyosarcomas might come from smooth muscle in the GI tract, or alternatively, from a blood vessel. At most other primary sites—retroperitoneal extremity (in the abdomen, behind the intestines), truncal, abdominal organs, etc.—leiomyosarcomas appear to grow from the muscle layer of a blood vessel (the tunica media).  Thus, a leiomyosarcoma can have a primary site of origin anywhere in the body from a blood vessel.

The tumors are usually hemorrhagic and soft and microscopically marked by pleomorphism, abundant (15–30 per 10 high-power fields) abnormal mitotic figures, and coagulative tumor cell necrosis. The differential diagnosis, which includes spindle cell carcinoma, spindle cell melanoma, fibrosarcoma, malignant peripheral nerve sheath tumor and even biphenotypic sinonasal sarcoma, is wide.

Diagnosis

Diagnosis of LMS is made by performing a soft-tissue biopsy and examining its histopathology.

Treatment
Surgery, with as wide a margin of removal as possible, has generally been the most effective and preferred way to attack LMS.  If surgical margins are narrow or not clear of tumor, however, or in some situations where tumor cells were left behind, chemotherapy or radiation has been shown to give a clear survival benefit.  While LMS tends to be resistant to radiation and chemotherapy, each case is different and results can vary widely. 

For metastatic (widespread) disease, chemotherapy and targeted therapies are the first choices. 
Chemotherapy regimens include: doxorubicin/ifosfamide and doxorubicin combination/gemcitabine and docetaxel/trabectedin; pazopanib is the targeted therapy used in metastatic leiomyosarcoma as second line and is well tolerated. 

LMS of uterine origin often responds to hormonal treatments. As of 2020,  several clinical trials for uterine LMS are active.

Notable cases

People who have had leiomyosarcoma include:
 Leicester City footballer Keith Weller, who made over 300 appearances for the Foxes, scored 47 goals. Also, he made four appearances for England, scoring one goal.
 Katie Price
 Canadian public-health physician Sheela Basrur (1956–2008) developed uterine leiomyosarcoma in 2006.
 American actress Diana Sands
 The first year of treatment for leiomyosarcoma of Canadian comedian Irwin Barker was the subject of a 2008 television documentary, That's My Time; he died in 2010.
 E. J. McGuire, long-time professional ice hockey coach, scout, and vice president of the National Hockey League Central Scouting Bureau
 Ellis Avery, American writer, two-time winner of the Stonewall Book Award
 Linda Uttley (1966–2009), English rugby union footballer in the Women's England Team, was diagnosed with leiomyosarcoma in 2007 and died in 2009 at the age of 43.
 Irene Hirano Inouye, founding President of the U.S.-Japan Council, a position she held ever since she helped create the organization in 2009 (see her Wikipedia entry for more information).
 Clay Langston, TSgt USAF was diagnosed in 2014 when after a small lump of 2 cm grew very rapidly to 10 cm in just a few month, was treated with Radiation therapy then surgery, but it kept reoccurring every 6 month for almost 2 years. The patient has not had a reoccurrence since late 2015.

See also
Uterine sarcoma

References

External links
 

Dermal and subcutaneous growths
Rare cancers
Connective and soft tissue neoplasms
Sarcoma
Epstein–Barr virus–associated diseases